

Television

2020s

2010s

2000s

1990s

Radio

2020s

2010s

2000s

1990s

See also 
 List of Hartford Whalers broadcasters

References 

 
Carolina Hurricanes
Carolina Hurricanes lists
Fox Sports Networks
Bally Sports